Nagaram is a village in Suryapet district of Telangana, India. It is located in Nagaram mandal of Suryapet revenue division.

References

Mandal headquarters in Suryapet district
Villages in Suryapet district